Moments of Mindfulness (originally published on October 5, 2005, by Parallax Press) is a non-fiction, self-help book by Thích Nhất Hạnh. It is like a journal for Meditation.

Overview 
Moments of Mindfulness is intended to be a personal notebook.

This book has teachings of Thích Nhất Hạnh, the Buddhist monk and basic meditation instructions. It has two-colour illustrations by Jenifer Kent. The set contains 40 cards to provide inspiration and work as starting points for meditation and reveal spiritual answers for daily problems. It also has blank pages for personal reflections.

References 

2005 non-fiction books
Meditation
Self-help books
Mindfulness